Borazjan (also Romanized as Borāzjān; also known as Qal‘eh Bārāzjun and Qal‘eh-ye Borāzjān) is a village in Tujerdi Rural District, Sarchehan District, Bavanat County, Fars Province, Iran. At the 2006 census, its population was 200, in 39 families.

References 

Populated places in Sarchehan County